Surita Kumari Sah is a Nepalese politician. She is a member of Provincial Assembly of Madhesh Province from Loktantrik Samajwadi Party, Nepal. Sah, a resident of Mahottari Rural Municipality, was elected via 2017 Nepalese provincial elections from Mahottari 2(B).

Electoral history

2017 Nepalese provincial elections

References

Living people
1966 births
Madhesi people
21st-century Nepalese women politicians
21st-century Nepalese politicians
Members of the Provincial Assembly of Madhesh Province
Loktantrik Samajwadi Party, Nepal politicians